It's Tomorrow Already is the third album by The Irresistible Force, released on September 21, 1998 through Ninja Tune.

Track listing

Personnel 
John Friendly – engineering
Gwen Jamois – engineering
Mixmaster Morris – instruments, arrangement, production
David Vallade – illustrations
Voda – engineering

References

External links 
 

1998 albums
The Irresistible Force albums
Ninja Tune albums